Henri Korn is a neuroscientist with the Pasteur Institute. In 1992 he won the Richard Lounsbery Award jointly with Philippe Ascher for "their discoveries of the mechanisms of synaptic transmission. Philippe Asher furthered knowledge regarding the properties of glutamate receptors which play an important role in trials, and Henri Korn brought to light the elementary liberation of neurotransmitter in quanta form in the central nervous system of vertebrates."

References 

French neuroscientists
Living people
Pasteur Institute
Richard-Lounsbery Award laureates
1934 births